Cucu Hidayat is an Indonesian footballer who plays for Persijap Jepara as a midfielder in the Indonesia Super League.

References
http://www.goal.com/en/people/indonesia/26323/cucu-hidayat

Indonesian footballers
Living people
1983 births
Sundanese people
Association football midfielders
Bhayangkara F.C. players
Persibo Bojonegoro players
Persita Tangerang players
Persijap Jepara players
Persikabo Bogor players
Persikad Depok players
Persib Bandung players
Sportspeople from Bandung